The 1987 Los Angeles Raiders season was the franchise's strike-shortened 28th season overall, and the franchise's 18th season in the National Football League. They finished with a disappointing record of 5–10 (the team's worst finish since Al Davis arrived in 1963). It was only the sixth losing season in franchise history.

Offseason

NFL draft

Since he did not sign with a team by the 1987 draft, Bo Jackson's rights were forfeited by Tampa Bay and his name was thrown back into the draft. The Raiders selected Jackson in the seventh round with the 183rd overall pick. Raiders owner Al Davis supported Jackson and his baseball career and got Jackson to sign a contract by offering him a salary that was comparable to a full-time starting running back but allowing Jackson to only play part-time until the baseball season was done.

Personnel

Staff

NFL replacement players
After the league decided to use replacement players during the NFLPA strike, the following team was assembled:

Roster

Regular season
Joining the Raiders midway through the 1987 season, Bo Jackson rushed for 554 yards on 81 carries in just seven games. Over the next three seasons, Bo Jackson would rush for 2,228 more yards and 12 touchdowns: a remarkable achievement, in light of the fact that he was a "second string" player behind Raiders legend Marcus Allen.

Jackson turned in a 221-yard rushing performance on Monday Night Football in 1987 against the Seattle Seahawks. During this game, he ran over Seahawks linebacker Brian Bosworth, who had insulted Jackson and promised in a media event before the game to contain Jackson. He also made a 91-yard run to the outside, untouched down the sideline. He continued sprinting until finally slowing down as he passed through the entrance to the field tunnel to the dressing rooms with teammates soon following. Jackson scored two rushing touchdowns and one receiving touchdown in the game.

Schedule

Game summaries

Week 1

    
    
    
    

Marcus Allen 33 Rush, 136 Yds

Week 11

Standings

Awards and records
 Howie Long, AFC Pro Bowl selection

References

 Raiders on Pro Football Reference
 Raiders on jt-sw.com
 Raiders stats on jt-sw.com

Los Angeles Raiders
1987
Los